Mechanicsburg Gap (also known as Mill Creek Gap) is a water gap through Mill Creek Mountain in Hampshire County in the U.S. state of West Virginia.

Mechanicsburg Gap allows for the passage of the Northwestern Turnpike (U.S. Route 50/West Virginia Route 28) and Mill Creek through Mill Creek Mountain. It takes its name from the community of Mechanicsburg at the gap's western entrance.

Today, Mechanicsburg Gap has a number of interesting features within it. Near The Burg (an 18th-century home) lies the Romney Spring which flows from a PVC pipe at the foot of the gap which is visited daily by its patrons along the side of U.S. Route 50. Mechanicsburg Gap is also home to the now closed limestone rock quarry which has cut a massive hole into the gap's northern wall. Adjacent to the quarry is the former Evelyn's Restaurant, which was long a popular steakhouse and truck stop. The site is now home to Good 'n Gooder, a store with a variety of used items.

External links

American Civil War sites in West Virginia
Landforms of Hampshire County, West Virginia
Hampshire County, West Virginia, in the American Civil War
Valleys of West Virginia
Northwestern Turnpike
Water gaps of the United States